CleverTap is a California-based SaaS company that offers customer lifecycle management and mobile marketing services via a software as a service (SaaS) platform. The company was established in May 2013, is headquartered in Mountain View, California. 

CleverTap's platform is built on the database that offers a balance of speed and scalability to enhance user engagement for its clients.

History
CleverTap was founded by Sunil Thomas, Suresh Kondamudi, and Anand Jain who were colleagues at Network 18. Together, they started CleverTap in May 2013. CleverTap publicly launched the product in September 2015, the company also changed its trading name from WizRocket to CleverTap. CleverTap hired Sidharth Malik as the global CEO in Dec 2021.

In May 2022, CleverTap announced the acquisition of Bulgarian-originated but San Francisco-based mobile marketing vendor Leanplum. While the price of the acquisition has not been disclosed, the company stated the funds were cash and stock transactions that were funded by internal accrual and CleverTap stock. The acquisition is set to aid with CleverTap's global reach, providing development centres and customer-facing teams across North America, Europe, Latin America, India, Southeast Asia, and the Middle East, with a total customer base of 1,300 customers.

Funding
The company secured a seed funding of USD 1.9 million from Accel in July 2014. It secured an additional Series A funding of US$8 million from Accel and Sequoia Capital in August 2015. In October 2017, the company secured an additional US$6 million from existing and new investor RSP India Fund, investment subsidiary of Recruit Holdings. In April 2019, CleverTap raised US$26 million in Series B investment from Sequoia Capital, Tiger Global Management, and Accel. In October 2019, CleverTap announced its Series C investment of US$35 million led by Sequoia Capital and Tiger Global Management, bringing the total investment to just over US$77 million. CleverTap announced it has raised $105 million in a Series D funding round led by global investment firm CDPQ (that has committed $75 million) along with participation from IIFL AMC's Tech Fund, and existing investors Tiger Global and Sequoia India.

Awards and recognition
In 2017, TiE Silicon Valley included CleverTap in its list of TiE50, World's 50 Most Promising Technology Startups. Sunil Thomas, CEO of the company, was named as one of the 25 Marketing Technology Trailblazers in 2017 by Advertising Age. In 2021, CleverTap was recognized as one of Forbes’ Best Startup Employers in America for the second consecutive year. In 2022, CleverTap was awarded the Breakout SaaS Startup of the Year by SaaSBOOMi, a community of SaaS founders and product builders shaping India's SaaS industry and was also included in the G2 list of best software sellers. In 2022, CleverTap was selected as one of India’s Great Mid-size Workplaces by Great Place To Work. Also in 2022, for the 12th time in a row, CleverTap was named a Leader in the Mobile Marketing category in the summer reports by G2.  In the G2 Fall 2022 report, CleverTap was named a global Leader in the Mobile Marketing category as well as a Momentum Leader, Leader for Asia and India regions, and Leaders in the Mid-Market and Small Business segments.  In October 2022, the company was named a Soonicorn — a soon-to-be Unicorn — by the website Tracxn.

See also
 Behavioral analytics

References

Privately held companies based in California
Marketing companies established in 2013
Marketing software
2013 establishments in the United States
Mobile technology companies
Technology companies of the United States
Companies based in Sunnyvale, California